Reinhard Zimmermann (born 10 October 1952) is a German jurist and a director of the Max Planck Institute for Comparative and International Private Law. Since 2011 he has been the President of the Studienstiftung des deutschen Volkes.

Life
Zimmermann was born in Hamburg and studied law at the University of Hamburg as a research associate under Hans Hermann Seiler. After completing his State Examination in 1979 he became a research assistant to Peter Meincke in Cologne, before taking over the Chair of Roman law and Comparative law (named for W. P. Schreiner) at the University of Cape Town in 1981. There he wrote the bulk of The Law of Obligations: Roman Foundations of the Civilian Tradition, now widely regarded as one of the most important works of comparative legal scholarship of the 20th century. In 1988 he returned to Germany and was appointed a professor at the University of Regensburg. Since 2002 he has been a director at the Max Planck Institute for Comparative and International Private Law in his hometown, Hamburg.

Honours and awards 
Zimmermann has nine honorary doctorates. He was elected a foreign member of the Royal Netherlands Academy of Arts and Sciences in 1997. He was elected a Corresponding Fellow of the Royal Society of Edinburgh in 2001. From 2006 to 2010 he was the chair of the social sciences division of the Max Planck Society. In 2008 Zimmermann was named an affiliate professor at the Bucerius Law School.

Popular Culture 

Zimmermann inspired the popular novel by Alexander McCall Smith, Portuguese Irregular Verbs.

References

Jurists from Hamburg
1952 births
Living people
Members of the Royal Netherlands Academy of Arts and Sciences
University of Hamburg alumni
Academic staff of the University of Regensburg
Max Planck Institute directors